Zdenko Morovic (born 31 August 1966) is a Venezuelan footballer. He played in five matches for the Venezuela national football team from 1987 to 1989. He was also part of Venezuela's squad for the 1987 Copa América tournament.

References

External links
 

1966 births
Living people
Venezuelan footballers
Venezuela international footballers
Place of birth missing (living people)
Association football midfielders
Deportivo Italia players
C.S. Marítimo de Venezuela players
Caracas FC players